Shub is a surname. Notable people with the surname include:

Anatole Shub, American author and journalist
Ellen Shub, American photojournalist
Esfir Shub, Soviet filmmaker
Michael Shub, American mathematician
Peter Shub, American actor

See also
DJ Shub
Shub (disambiguation)